The Wolstonian Stage is a middle Pleistocene stage of the geological history of Earth from approximately 374,000 until 130,000 years ago. It precedes the Eemian Stage in Europe and follows the Hoxnian Stage in the British Isles. 

It is also approximately analogous to the Warthe and Saalian stages in northern Europe; the Riss glaciation in the Alps; and the Illinoian Stage in North America. 

It is equivalent to Marine isotope stages (MIS) 10 through 6. MIS 10, 8  and 6 were glacial periods and 9 and 7 were interglacials.

It is named after Wolston in the English county of Warwickshire.

Description
The Wolstonian Stage is a middle Pleistocene stage of the geological history of Earth that precedes the Ipswichian Stage (Eemian Stage in Europe) and follows the Hoxnian Stage in the British Isles. The Wolstonian Stage apparently includes three periods of glaciation. The Wolstonian Stage is temporally analogous to the Warthe Stage and Saalian Stage in northern Europe and the Riss glaciation in the Alps, and temporally equivalent to all of the Illinoian Stage and the youngest part of the Pre-Illinoian Stage in North America. It is contemporaneous with the North American Pre-Illinoian A, Early Illinoian, and Late Illinoian glaciations.

The Wolstonian Stage is equivalent to Marine isotope stages 6 through 10.

Britain became an Island during this period (350,000 years ago). 

It started 374,000 years ago and ended 130,000 years ago.

Etymology
The Wolstonian Stage was named after the site of Wolston in the English county of Warwickshire where corresponding deposits were first identified.

Archaeology
Acheulian flint tools have been found in Wolstonian deposits.

Pleistocene glaciation

See also
Glacial period
Ice age
Timeline of glaciation

References

External links

Gibbard, P., 2008a, Map 6. (Fluvial) Palaeogeography during the Saalian (Drenthe Substage) / Wolstonian glacial maximum. North West European Rivers, Quaternary Palaeoenvironments Group, Cambridge, England. (includes PDF file of map)
 (includes PDF file of map)
 (includes PDF file of map)

Shotton, F.W., nd, East Anglia and the English Midlands. Ice Age Britain. The Shotton Project, University of Birmingham, Birmingham, England.

Further reading

Glaciology
Stone Age Britain
Pleistocene
Ice ages